The Dominican Summer Phillies are a minor league baseball team in the Dominican Summer League. The team plays in the Boca Chica North division and is affiliated with the Philadelphia Phillies.

Roster

External links
DSL Phillies on SABR Minor Leagues Database

Baseball teams established in 1985
Dominican Summer League teams
Baseball teams in the Dominican Republic
Philadelphia Phillies minor league affiliates
1985 establishments in the Dominican Republic